The 1989 European Women Basketball Championship, commonly called EuroBasket Women 1989, was the 22nd regional championship held by FIBA Europe. The competition was held in Bulgaria and took place from 13 June to 19 June 1989.  won the gold medal and  the silver medal while  won the bronze.

Qualification

Group A

Group B

Squads

First stage

Group A

Group B

Play-off stages

Final standings

External links 
 FIBA Europe profile
 Todor66 profile

 
1989
1989 in Bulgarian women's sport
International women's basketball competitions hosted by Bulgaria
June 1989 sports events in Europe
Euro